The Bon Soo Winter Carnival is an annual winter carnival in Sault Ste. Marie, Ontario, Canada. The festival features a diverse program of outdoor and indoor sports and activity events, as well as cultural activities including concerts, ice sculptures, and a polar bear swim.

The Bon Soo Winter Carnival is a remnant of French Canadian culture, tracing its roots back to the Montreal Carnivale.  The carnival is named after its mascot Bon Soo, created by Ken MacDougall.

See also
 Winter festival

References

External links
 
 Site with photo gallery of Bon Soo 2006

Winter festivals in Canada
Festivals in Sault Ste. Marie, Ontario
Tourist attractions in Algoma District
Recurring events established in 1964
1964 establishments in Ontario
Carnivals in Canada